Susan Meld Shell (born March 24, 1948) is an American philosopher and Professor and Chair of the Department of Political Science at Boston College. She is known for her research on Kantian philosophy.

Books
 Kant and the Limits of Autonomy (Harvard University Press, 2009)
 The Embodiment of Reason: Kant on Spirit, Generation and Community (University of Chicago Press, 1996)
 The Rights of Reason: A Study of Kant's Philosophy and Politics (University of Toronto Press, 1980)
 America at Risk: Threats to Liberal Self-Government in an Age of Uncertainty, edited by Susan Shell and Robert K. Faulkner (University of Michigan Press, 2009)
 Kant's 'Observations' and 'Remarks': A Critical Guide, edited by Susan Shell and Richard Velkley (Cambridge University Press, 2012).

References

External links
 Susan Shell at Boston College

21st-century American philosophers
Political philosophers
Kant scholars
Philosophy academics
Harvard University alumni
Cornell University alumni
Boston College faculty
Living people
1949 births
Catholic University of America faculty
Fellows of the National Endowment for the Humanities
Bradley Foundation Fellows
ACLS Fellows
American women philosophers
Earhart Foundation Fellows
21st-century American women